The 1981 Bristol Open, also known by its sponsored name Lambert & Butler Championships, was a tennis tournament played on outdoor grass courts that was part of the 1981 Volvo Grand Prix. It was played at Bristol in Great Britain and was held from 15 June until 20 June 1981.  Unseeded Mark Edmondson won the singles title.

Finals

Singles

 Mark Edmondson defeated  Roscoe Tanner 6–3, 5–7, 6–4
 It was Edmondson's 2nd title of the year and the 15th of his career.

Doubles

 Billy Martin /  Russell Simpson defeated  John Austin /  Johan Kriek 6–3, 4–6, 6–4
 It was Martin's only title of the year and the 4th of his career. It was Simpson's only title of the year and the 5th of his career.

References

External links
 ITF tournament edition details

 
Bristol Open
Bristol Open
1981 in English tennis